The 2022 Malaysia Super League, is the 19th season of the Malaysia Super League, the top-tier professional football league in Malaysia for association football clubs since its establishment in 2004, and the 41st season of top-flight Malaysia football overall.

The defending champions from the 2021 Malaysia Super League season is Johor Darul Ta'zim.

Teams

Changes from last season

Team changes
Promoted from the 2021 Malaysia Premier League
 Negeri Sembilan
 Sarawak United

Relegated to the 2022 Malaysia Premier League
 Perak
 UiTM

Clubs locations

Personnel, kit and sponsoring

Coaching changes
Note: Flags indicate national team as has been defined under FIFA eligibility rules. Players may hold more than one non-FIFA nationality.

Foreign players

Southeast Asia (SEA) players are required to have acquired at least 30 international caps for their senior national team with no period restriction on when they are earned while those who has less than 30 international caps will be subjected to MFL approval.

Johor Darul Ta'zim, Selangor and Terengganu who have their "B" team playing in the Premier League can register another 4 players (3 + 1 AFC).  These players can play for the "A" team as long as they fulfilled the relevant regulations under the handbook.

Note: Flags indicate national team as defined under FIFA eligibility rules. Players may hold more than one FIFA and non-FIFA nationality.

 Players name in bold indicates the player is registered during the mid-season transfer window.
 Foreign players who left their clubs or were de-registered from playing squad due to medical issues or other matters.

The following foreigners are registered by JDT II, Selangor II and Terengganu FC II for the Malaysia Premier League.

Naturalisation/Heritage players

Notes:
  Carrying Malaysian heritage.
  Capped for Malaysia national team.

League table

Result table

Positions by round
The table lists the positions of teams after each week of matches.In order to preserve chronological evolvements, any postponed matches are not included to the round at which they were originally scheduled but added to the full round they were played immediately afterward.

Season statistics
First goal of the season: 50 minutes and 58 seconds 
 Khair Jones for Negeri Sembilan (A) against Sabah  (4 March 2022)

 Fastest goal in a match: 51 seconds
 Kpah Sherman for Terengganu (H) against Sri Pahang (3 July 2022)

 Latest goal in a match: 90 + 10 minutes and 16 seconds
 Fernando Forestieri for Johor Darul Ta'zim (A) against Negeri Sembilan (11 May 2022)

 Oldest Goalscorer in a match: 41 Years 6 Months 10 Days
 Amri Yahyah for Sabah against Melaka United (31 July 2022)

 Widest winning margin: 7 goals
 Selangor 7–0 Sarawak United (19 June 2022)

 Most goals in a match: 7 goals
 Selangor 7–0 Sarawak United (19 June 2022)
 Negeri Sembilan 4–3 Kedah Darul Aman (8 October 2022)

Top goalscorers

Hat-trick

Notes
(H) – Home team
(A) – Away team

Clean Sheets

Discipline

Players
 Most yellow cards: 7 
 Saiful Ridzuwan (Negeri Sembilan)

 Most red cards: 1 
 Bergson (Johor Darul Ta'zim)
 Giancarlo Gallifuoco (Kuala Lumpur City)
 Kenny Pallraj (Kuala Lumpur City)
 Haziq Puad (Melaka)
 Wan Zaharulnizam (Melaka)
 Matheus Alves (Negeri Sembilan)
 Nasrullah Haniff (Negeri Sembilan)
 Sukri Hamid (Penang)
 Rafael Vitor (Penang)
 Rizal Ghazali (Sabah)
 Rawilson Batuil (Sabah)
 Sharul Nazeem (Selangor)
 Yazan Al-Arab (Selangor)
 Zikri Khalili (Selangor)
 Raja Imran Shah (Sarawak United)
 Sharbinee Allawee (Sarawak United)
 Azwan Aripin (Sri Pahang)
 Muslim Ahmad (Sri Pahang)
 Kpah Sherman (Terengganu)

Club
 Most red cards: 3
 Selangor

 Most yellow cards: 51
 Selangor

 Fewest yellow cards: 22
 Terengganu

 Fewest red cards: 0
 Kedah Darul Aman
 Petaling Jaya City

Attendances to Stadiums

References

See also
 2022 Malaysia Premier League
 2022 Malaysia M3 League
 2022 Malaysia M5 League
 2022 Malaysia FA Cup
 2022 Malaysia Cup
 2022 Piala Presiden
 2022 Piala Belia

Malaysia Super League
Malaysia Super League seasons
1